The Faculty of Electrical Engineering, Energetics and Applied Informatics is an academic division of the Gheorghe Asachi Technical University of Iaşi, Romania, devoted to study and research in electrical engineering.

History

The Faculty of Electrical Engineering was founded in 1910, as the first school of its kind in Romania. The first dean and founder of the faculty was the famous professor Dragomir Hurmuzescu. A statue (bust) sits in the front of the faculty building today.

In 1938, the school, later transformed in electrical preparation institute, was acknowledged as a faculty of the Iasi "Gheorghe Asachi" Polytechnic School.

In 1942, the name is changed to "Faculty of Electro-mechanics", including 2 classes. A class for electrical engineering, and a class for mechanical engineering. From 1948, the faculty changed its name to "Electrical Engineering Faculty".The name of the faculty today is "Faculty of Electrical Engineering, Energy and Applied Informatics"

In 1957, the class of electro-mechanics was created. In 1960, the class of Energetics was created, and in 1995 a hybrid class was created called "Economics Engineering", class that blends electrical and economics curricula. The last class added was in 2003, the class for Industrial Programming.

To this day, the faculty is a member of the Gheorghe Asachi Technical University of Iaşi.

References

External links
Faculty of Electrical Engineering

Gheorghe Asachi Technical University of Iași
Electrical engineering departments

fr:Université technique Gh. Asachi
ro:Universitatea Tehnică Gheorghe Asachi din Iaşi